Conor John Gallagher (born 6 February 2000) is an English professional footballer who plays as a midfielder for Premier League club Chelsea and the England national team.

Beginning his career with Chelsea, Gallagher spent time on loan at EFL Championship clubs Charlton Athletic, Swansea City, and Premier League clubs West Bromwich Albion and Crystal Palace, between 2019 and 2022. At Crystal Palace, Gallagher was named the club's Player of the Year for the 2021–22 season. He subsequently made his first-team debut at Chelsea during the 2022–23 season.

After representing England at various youth levels, Gallagher made his debut for the senior national team in November 2021.

Early and personal life
Gallagher was born in Epsom, Surrey to Lee and Samantha Gallagher and is the youngest of their four sons. He grew up in Great Bookham and attended Howard of Effingham School. His older brothers, Jake, Josh and Dan, are footballers at non-league level. Gallagher's family are Chelsea fans, and he lived a ten-minute drive from their training ground in Stoke d'Abernon.

Club career

Early career

After playing for Epsom Eagles, Gallagher joined Chelsea at the age of eight. In October 2018, he signed a new contract with Chelsea, contracting him to the club until June 2021. He had minor heart surgery that year. In May 2019, he was an unused substitute in the 2019 UEFA Europa League Final, collecting a winner's medal. He was awarded Chelsea's Academy Player of the Year for the 2018–19 season.

2019–20 season: Loans to Charlton Athletic and Swansea City
In August 2019, Gallagher signed a new three-year contract with Chelsea and moved on loan to Championship club Charlton Athletic. After his first month with Charlton, in which he scored three goals in six matches, he won the EFL Young Player of the Month award for August. On 14 January 2020, Gallagher was recalled by Chelsea. 

On 15 January 2020, the day after leaving Charlton, Gallagher joined Championship club Swansea City on loan for the rest of the 2019–20 season. He later said that his time at Swansea allowed him to be more creative as a player.

2020–21 season: Loan to West Bromwich Albion
On 17 September 2020, Gallagher signed a new five-year contract with Chelsea, and joined fellow Premier League club West Bromwich Albion on loan for the 2020–21 season. On 28 November 2020, Gallagher scored his first Premier League goal and his first goal for West Brom in a 1–0 home league win over Sheffield United.

2021–22 season: Loan to Crystal Palace
In July 2021, Gallagher joined Premier League club Crystal Palace on loan for the 2021–22 season. He scored two goals in a 2–2 draw with West Ham United on 28 August 2021, his first goals for Palace. In November, Gallagher was subjected to homophobic chants from a group of Leeds United fans; the club issued a statement which condemned this. By the start of December, he had six goals and three assists for Crystal Palace, the most of any Premier League player aged 21 or under. On 15 April 2022, he was prevented by parent club Chelsea from playing against them in the FA Cup semi-final; Chelsea manager Thomas Tuchel apologised for doing so. Chelsea went on to defeat Palace 2–0.

During his season with Palace, Gallagher was described by The Daily Telegraph as "one of the Premier League's most vibrant talents" and "a key player for Patrick Vieira", who was "thriving in his box-to-box role". For his performances with the club, he was later named Crystal Palace's Player of the Season.

2022–23 season: Return to Chelsea
In July 2022, ahead of the 2022–23 season, Gallagher said he was determined to make a first-team breakthrough at Chelsea. On 6 August 2022, he made his Chelsea debut, as a substitute, in a 1–0 away win against Everton in the Premier League. On 1 October, he scored his first goal for Chelsea, a 90th-minute winner in a 2–1 away victory over his former club, Crystal Palace.

International career
Gallagher's family heritage meant he was eligible to play for England, Scotland or the Republic of Ireland until he made a competitive appearance for any at senior level. He represented England at under-17, under-18, under-19 and under-20 youth levels, winning the 2017 FIFA U-17 World Cup in India. 

On 8 October 2019, Gallagher received his first call up to the England U21 squad and made his debut on 11 October as a substitute during a 2–2 draw against Slovenia in Maribor.

On 14 November 2021, he received his first call-up to the England senior squad. The following day, he earned his first cap, coming on as a half-time substitute in England's 10–0 win over San Marino.

He was named in England's squad for the 2022 FIFA World Cup.

Style of play
Gallagher has said his "best position is as a box-to-box midfielder [...] I can play deeper and I can play attacking as well", and was described by Lee Bowyer, his manager at Charlton at the time, as "an all-round midfielder. His work-rate is unreal, he puts his foot in for tackles and he can also see a pass". Patrick Vieira likened Gallagher's style of play to that of former players Ray Parlour and Frank Lampard, who was Gallagher's idol while he was growing up.

Career statistics

Club

International

Honours
Chelsea
UEFA Europa League: 2018–19

England U17
FIFA U-17 World Cup: 2017

Individual
Chelsea Academy Player of the Year: 2018–19
EFL Young Player of the Month: August 2019
Crystal Palace F.C. Player of the Year: 2021–22

References

External links

Profile at Chelsea F.C. website
Profile at Football Association website

2000 births
Living people
Sportspeople from Epsom
Footballers from Surrey
English footballers
Association football midfielders
Chelsea F.C. players
Charlton Athletic F.C. players
Swansea City A.F.C. players
West Bromwich Albion F.C. players
Crystal Palace F.C. players
English Football League players
Premier League players
England youth international footballers
England under-21 international footballers
England international footballers
2022 FIFA World Cup players
English people of Irish descent
English people of Scottish descent